Danquah Circle a roundabout in Accra, Ghana named after a prominent politician and a member of the Big Six Dr Joseph Boakye Danquah.It is a key intersection in the arterial road network of Accra. Located at the intersection of four major arterials, it carries 28,000 vehicles a day.

Location

It is located on the Ako Adjei Interchange to Labadi Road. It connects Oxford Street, Accra to Cantonments, Accra
There is a statue of Dr Joseph Boakye Danquah erected as well as other statues in his commemoration.

References

External links
 Photos of statues in Danquah Circle

Accra
Roads in Ghana